The women's cross-country team at the  University of New Mexico,  known as the New Mexico Lobos, won the NCAA championship in 2015 and 2017. Also in 2017, Lobo Ednah Kurgat won the individual title with a record-setting time of 19:19.42. The team placed second nationally in 2018.

In 2021, they won the Mountain West Conference for the 13th year in a row (https://golobos.com/news/2021/03/05/lobos-claim-mountain-west-title-for-thirteenth-year-in-a-row/). Also that year, they were earned a top-10 place in the NCAA for the 11th year in a row. (https://golobos.com/news/2021/03/15/lobos-claim-11th-straight-top-10-finish-in-the-ncaa-di-cross-country-championships/)

Earlier in their history, the team placed in the top 10 nationally four times.

2015 season 

The team started the preseason at second place in the USTFCCCA poll. It started the regular season at the No. 1 spot in the poll.

Senior Courtney Frerichs was named Mountain West Conference athlete of the week.

The team won the Wisconsin Adidas Invitational. They won their eight-straight conference title. UNM hosted the NCAA Mountain Regional Championships, where the Lobo women placed second.

The team won the national title. According to golobos.com, "The Lobo women, competing in their 10th-ever NCAA Championship, placed all five of their scorers in the top 25 at E.P. 'Tom' Sawyer State Park in Louisville and combined to score 49 points, the lowest team score by any team since 1982." The team had "an 80-point victory over runner-up Colorado." Courtney Frerichs placed fourth overall, with a time of 19 minutes, 48 seconds, over 6 kilometers.

Three Lobo women were chosen to compete at the 2015 SPAR European Cross Country Championships.

Roster 

Name, Year, Hometown / School
 Lindsey Andrews, Sr., Kansas City, Mo. / Columbia College
 Rhona Auckland, Jr., Torphins, Scotland / University of Edinburgh
 Natasha Bernal, Fr., Albuquerque, N.M. / La Cueva HS
 Anna Burton, Sr., Staffordshire, England / University of Bristol
 Sophie Connor, Sr., Hertfordshire, England / University of Warwick
 Mackenzie Everett, Fr., Albuquerque, N.M. / La Cueva HS
 Courtney Frerichs, Sr., Nixa, Mo. / UMKC
 Ruth Haynes, Jr., Surrey, England / Birmingham University
 Emily Hosker-Thornhill, Sr., Canterbury, England / St Mary's University
 Kendall Kelly, R-Fr., Albuquerque, N.M. / Bosque School
 Reiley Kelly, R-Fr., Albuquerque, N.M. / Bosque School
 Jaime Mitsos, Fr., Lockport Township, Ill. / Lockport Township HS
 Molly Renfer, Sr., Esher, England / Harvard University
 Heleene Tambet, Sr., Viljandi, Estonia / Hugo Treffner Gymnasium
 Calli Thackery, Sr., Yorkshire, England / Leeds Metropolitan University
 Whitney Thornburg, Sr., Ashville, N.C. / Harvard University
 Alice Wright, R-So., Worcester, England / The King's School, Worcester

Coaching Staff 

 Joe Franklin, Head Coach
 James Butler, Assistant Coach
 Dr. Richard Ceronie, Assistant Coach

Franklin was named NCAA women's coach of the year for the NCAA Mountain Region and the NCAA nationally.

2016 season 
On Oct. 28, 2016, the Lobos won their ninth-straight Mountain West Conference title. Their score was 42 points. The second-place team, Air Force Academy, scored 53. Alice Wright won in 20 minutes, 2.7 seconds over 6 kilometers.

References

https://www.abqjournal.com/1094930/womens-cross-country-team-wins-second-title-in-three-years-kurgat-sets-meet-record-as-unms-first-individual-winner.html

Sources 

 The University of New Mexico Lobos

External links
 

 Womens cross country
College cross country teams in the United States
Women's sports in the United States
Women's sports in New Mexico